Aristeas (Ἀριστέας) was a 7th-century BC Greek poet.

Aristeas may also refer to:

People
 Aristeas of Stratonice, ancient Olympic pankration champion
 Aristeas of Argos, a rival of Antigonus II Gonatas
 Aristeas (sculptor), an artist known to us from two sculptures of centaurs

Other uses
 Aristeas of Marmora, a fictional character in The Dreaming (comics)

See also
 Aristea, genus of plants
 Aristeus (ancient Greece) (also Ἀριστέας),  the name of a number of people from classical antiquity
 Letter of Aristeas to Philocrates, a Hellenistic work of the 3rd or early 2nd century BC